"Somos Novios" (Spanish for "We Are Lovers") is a song first recorded by Mexican songwriter Armando Manzanero in 1968. Originally a French song "J'ai le mal de toi", different versions with unrelated lyrics in different languages have been written and recorded. Perry Como recorded an English version of "Somos Novios" with original English lyrics titled "It's Impossible", which was a top 10 hit in the US and the UK.

The song has become one of the most popular boleros of all time and it has been covered by numerous artists. The recording by Manzanero was inducted into the Latin Grammy Hall of Fame in 2001.

Background
The song has its origin in a song "J'ai le mal de toi" written by Jack Dieval and Michel Rivgauche. It was performed by Frédérica in 1960 as an unsuccessful submission for the selection of the French entry for the Eurovision Song Contest.  in 1964, Colette Deréal recorded the first known recording of the song. It was recorded in English by Kathy Kirby as "The Way of Love" in 1965.

In 1968 Armando Manzareno wrote original Spanish lyrics and recorded a version as "Somos Novios" with a tune closely similar to "J'ai le mal de toi". However, "Somos Novios" is regarded as a separate song with Manzareno credited as its only songwriter. The song was the title track of Manzareno third album Somos Novios released in July 1968. Manzareno also appeared in the 1969 Mexican film of the same title Somos Novios starring Palito Ortega, and performed the song. The song was included in the inaugural inductions for the Latin Grammy Hall of Fame established in 2001 to honor early Latin music recordings.

Perry Como version

"Somos Novios" was adapted in 1970 by Sid Wayne, who wrote original English lyrics set to the music. Sid Wayne was a collaborator with Elvis Presley, but decided to give the song instead to Perry Como. Perry Como recorded the song under the title "It's Impossible".

The Como version would be one of his most influential records, and in February 1971 it became his first song to reach the top ten of the Billboard Hot 100 in more than 12 years, peaking at No. 10. The song's peak on the Hot 100 chart came just weeks after concluding a four-week run at number one on the Billboard Easy Listening chart. On the UK Singles Chart, the single reached No. 4 in 1971.

Como's version was nominated for Song of the Year at the 1971 Grammy but lost to "You've Got a Friend".

Charts

Andrea Bocelli versions

Italian tenor Andrea Bocelli recorded the song with American singer Christina Aguilera in 2006. The duet was released as a single in from Bocelli's eleventh studio album, Amore (2006). Aguilera and Bocelli performed the song together at the Sanremo Music Festival on March 3, 2006.

Another version of the duet with Japanese singer Rimi Natsukawa was released as a bonus track in the album's Japanese edition, as well as a bonus track for the Japanese edition of Bocelli's first greatest hits album The Best of Andrea Bocelli: Vivere (2007).
Bocelli has also covered the song as a duet with a number of other artists, including Petra Berger and Katharine McPhee.

Bocelli McPhee joined Bocelli onstage at the  JCPenney Jam and their version is included on the album for the event.

See also
List of number-one adult contemporary singles of 1970 (U.S.)

References

External links
 "Somos Novios" — Roberto Rubio

1970 singles
2006 singles
Songs written by Armando Manzanero
Songs written by Sid Wayne
Perry Como songs
Andrea Bocelli songs
Christina Aguilera songs
Luis Miguel songs
Andy Williams songs
Song recordings produced by David Foster
Male–female vocal duets
Spanish-language songs
Boleros
1968 songs
Latin Grammy Hall of Fame Award recipients
RCA Victor singles
Decca Records singles